Väinö Auer (January 7, 1895, Helsinki – March 20, 1981, Helsinki), the son of senator , was a Finnish geologist and geographer, chiefly remembered as an explorer of Tierra del Fuego and Patagonia. He is also noted for his pioneering studies on tephrochronology, desertification, and the development of bogs.

Auer studied at the University of Helsinki, graduating B.Sc. (1917), M.Sc. (1918), and Ph.D. (1923). His studies were interrupted by the Finnish Civil War, where he saw action in 1918. Auer became a professor of geography at the University of Helsinki in 1929.

While holding his professorship Auer launched expeditions to Tierra del Fuego in 1928–1929, and to Patagonia in 1937–1938. Following the end of World War II he relocated to Argentina in 1946, entering the service of the Argentine government as an advisor to the Juan Perón regime and the Central Bank, among other functions. During his years in Argentina, Auer continued his earlier studies on the natural history of Patagonia and Tierra del Fuego, while advising the Argentine government in matters related to land use and colonization of the country's southern frontier.

Auer returned to Finland in 1953. In the last years of his professional career, he served as a professor of geography (1953–1957), and of geology and palaeontology (1957–1963) at the University of Helsinki.

A documentary film about the life and work of Auer in Finland and Latin America was published on 2007 and broadcast on Magellan Chile. Auer was geographer, explorer and above all swamp geologist. His swamp auger reached the central, post ice age layers of earth's climate history in Canada, Finland, Tierra del Fuego and Patagonia. The film travels in time to the different stages of Auer's life: in the swamps and wilderness of Finland, the peculiar shallow swamps of Tierra del Fuego and the Patagonian pampas that are whipped by dusty winds.

The documentary film is based on Auer's diary entries and articles. Through them, it also takes a tour of dramatic human history in the 20th century. In that perspective he confesses his involvement in the construction of a German submarine base in Tierra del Fuego in 1943, which, if true, makes a remarkable rewriting of knowledge of the Second World War.

Notable publications
For a complete list cf. Alhonen & Alhonen (2006).

 Auer, V. (1960) The Quaternary History of Fuego-Patagonia. Proceedings of the Royal Society B, 152.
 Auer, V. (1956–1970) The Pleistocene of Fuego-Patagonia. Parts I–V. Annales Academiae Scientarum Fennicae A III, 45, 50, 60, 80, 100, 1300 pp.

References
 Alhonen, P. & Alhonen, A. (2006). Vaakavarren ratsastaja: Tutkimusmatkailija Väinö Auerin elämä (a biography in Finnish). Edico, Helsinki.

External links
 Väinö Auer at the Deutsche Nationalbibliothek.

1895 births
1981 deaths
People from Uusimaa Province (Grand Duchy of Finland)
Explorers of South America
Finnish geologists
Finnish geographers
Palynologists
University of Helsinki alumni
Academic staff of the University of Helsinki
Finnish expatriates in Argentina
Finnish explorers
20th-century geographers
20th-century geologists